Bottle cap collecting is the hobby of collecting metallic crown caps. The hobby may or may not include drinking beverages that have been sealed with crown caps. Opening bottles with traditional openers may damage the crown caps, thus some collectors use automatic bottle openers to avoid any substantial damage to the crown caps.

World records

Largest collection
Pol Høegh Poulsen is the record holder, who has a collection of over 101,700 unique bottle caps, which is the largest collection in the world.

Longest chain of bottle caps
There is also a record for longest line of bottle caps, which is 87,575 bottle caps.

Mass culture
In the video game series Fallout, bottlecaps are collected and used as a form of currency.

See also

 Autograph collecting
 Bicycle collecting
 Book collecting
 Button collecting
 Casino chip collecting
 Coin collecting
 Comic book collecting
 County collecting
 Element collecting
 Fossil collecting
 Handbag collecting
 Insect collecting
 Knife collecting
 Mineral collecting
 Patch collecting
 Plant collecting
 Police item collecting
 Scout item collecting
 Seaweed collecting
 Sneaker collecting
 Stamp collecting
 Video game collecting

References

External links
 Bottle Caps Database - Alphabetical & Searchable
 Bottle Caps Database - Searchable

Collecting